Kosta is a locality situated in Lessebo Municipality, Kronoberg County, Sweden with 884 inhabitants in 2010.

It is located between the cities of Kalmar and Växjö, in the forested Småland province.

Kosta is known for the glassworks, Kosta Glasbruk (Kosta Boda).

Climate

References 

Populated places in Kronoberg County
Populated places in Lessebo Municipality
Värend